Tin(II) fluoride, commonly referred to commercially as stannous fluoride (from Latin , 'tin'), is a chemical compound with the formula SnF2. It is a colourless solid used as an ingredient in toothpastes.

Oral health benefits
Stannous fluoride was introduced as an alternative to sodium fluoride for the prevention of cavities (tooth decay). It was introduced for this purpose by Joseph Muhler and William Nebergall. In recognition for their innovation, these two individuals were inducted into the Inventor's Hall of Fame.

The fluoride in stannous fluoride helps to convert the calcium mineral apatite in teeth into fluorapatite, which makes tooth enamel more resistant to bacteria-generated acid attacks. The calcium present in plaque and saliva reacts with fluoride to form calcium fluoride on the tooth surface; over time, this calcium fluoride dissolves to allow calcium and fluoride ions to interact with the tooth and form fluoride-containing apatite within the tooth structure. This chemical reaction inhibits demineralisation and can promote remineralisation of tooth decay. The resulting fluoride-containing apatite is more insoluble, and more resistant to acid and tooth decay.

In addition to fluoride, the stannous ion has benefits for oral health when incorporated in a toothpaste. At similar fluoride concentrations, toothpastes containing stannous fluoride have been shown to be more effective than toothpastes containing sodium fluoride for reducing the incidence of dental caries and dental erosion, as well as reducing gingivitis. Some stannous fluoride-containing toothpastes also contain ingredients that allow for better stain removal. Stabilised stannous fluoride formulations allow for greater bioavailability of the stannous and fluoride ion, increasing their oral health benefits. A systematic review revealed stabilised stannous fluoride-containing toothpastes had a positive effect on the reduction of plaque, gingivitis and staining, with a significant reduction in calculus and halitosis (bad breath) compared to other toothpastes. A specific formulation of stabilised stannous fluoride toothpastes has shown superior protection against dental erosion and dentine hypersensitivity compared to other fluoride-containing and fluoride-free toothpastes.

Stannous fluoride was once used under the trade name Fluoristan in the original formulation of the toothpaste brand Crest, though it was later replaced with sodium monofluorophosphate under the trade name Fluoristat. Stabilised stannous fluoride is now the active ingredient in Crest/Oral B Pro-Health brand toothpaste. Although concerns have been previously raised that stannous fluoride may cause tooth staining, this can be avoided by proper brushing and by using a stabilised stannous fluoride toothpaste. Any stannous fluoride staining that occurs due to improper brushing is not permanent, and Crest/Oral B Pro-Health states that its particular formulation is resistant to staining.

Production
SnF2 can be prepared by evaporating a solution of SnO in 40% HF.

SnO + 2 HF → SnF2 + H2O

Aqueous solutions
Readily soluble in water, SnF2 is hydrolysed. At low concentration, it forms species such as SnOH+, Sn(OH)2 and Sn(OH)3−. At higher concentrations, predominantly polynuclear species are formed, including Sn2(OH)22+ and Sn3(OH)42+. Aqueous solutions readily oxidise to form insoluble precipitates of SnIV, which are ineffective as a dental prophylactic. Studies of the oxidation using Mössbauer spectroscopy on frozen samples suggests that O2 is the oxidizing species.

Lewis acidity
SnF2 acts as a Lewis acid. For example, it forms a 1:1 complex (CH3)3NSnF2 and 2:1 complex [(CH3)3N]2SnF2 with trimethylamine, and a 1:1 complex with dimethylsulfoxide, (CH3)2SO·SnF2. In solutions containing the fluoride ion, F−, it forms the fluoride complexes SnF3−, Sn2F5−, and SnF2(OH2). Crystallization from an aqueous solution containing NaF produces compounds containing polynuclear anions, e.g. NaSn2F5 or Na4Sn3F10 depending on the reaction conditions, rather than NaSnF3. The compound NaSnF3, containing the pyramidal SnF3− anion, can be produced from a pyridine–water solution.

Reducing properties
SnF2 is a reducing agent, with a standard reduction potential of Eo (SnIV/ SnII) = +0.15 V. Solutions in HF are readily oxidised by a range of oxidizing agents (O2, SO2 or F2) to form the mixed-valence compound Sn3F8 (containing SnII and SnIV and no Sn–Sn bonds).

Structure
The monoclinic form contains tetramers, Sn4F8, where there are two distinct coordination environments for the Sn atoms. In each case, there are three nearest neighbours, with Sn at the apex of a trigonal pyramid, and the lone pair of electrons sterically active. Other forms reported have the GeF2 and paratellurite structures.

Molecular SnF2
In the vapour phase, SnF2 forms monomers, dimers, and trimers. Monomeric SnF2 is a non-linear molecule with an Sn−F bond length of 206 pm. Complexes of SnF2, sometimes called difluorostannylene, with an alkyne and aromatic compounds deposited in an argon matrix at 12 K have been reported.

Safety
Stannous fluoride can cause redness and irritation if it is inhaled or comes into contact with the eyes. If ingested, it can cause abdominal pains and shock. Rare but serious allergic reactions are possible; symptoms include itching, swelling, and difficulty breathing. Certain formulations of stannous fluoride in dental products may cause mild tooth discoloration; this is not permanent and can be removed by brushing, or can be prevented by using a stabilised stannous fluoride toothpaste.

References

Fluorides
Metal halides
Tin(II) compounds
Reducing agents